The 2012–13 Ohio State Buckeyes men's basketball team represents Ohio State University in the 2012–13 NCAA Division I men's basketball season.  Their head coach is Thad Matta, in his ninth season with the Buckeyes.  The team plays its home games at Value City Arena in Columbus, Ohio. They finished with a record of 29–8 overall, 13–5 in Big Ten play for a second place tie with Michigan State. They won the 2013 Big Ten Conference men's basketball tournament and receive an automatic bid in the 2013 NCAA Division I men's basketball tournament which they were defeated by Wichita State in the Elite Eight.

Before the season

Previous season
The Ohio State Buckeyes began the 2011–12 season ranked #3 in the nation and would go on to an 8–0 start to the season, with their first loss coming at Allen Fieldhouse against the Kansas Jayhawks.  Ohio State remained in the top three through the first two months of the season, until they lost their first conference game of the season on December 31 against the Indiana Hoosiers.  Ohio State went 13–5 through Big Ten play and ended the season with a 25–6 record and won a share of the Big Ten regular season championship, sharing it with Michigan State and Michigan.  Ohio State would end up losing in the championship game of the Big Ten tournament and enter the NCAA tournament as a #2 seed.  Ohio State would go on to defeat Syracuse in the Elite Eight en route to the program's eleventh Final Four appearance.  Ohio State lost to the Kansas Jayhawks in the Final Four and ended the season with a 31–8 record and #3 ranking.  After the season, Jared Sullinger declared for the NBA draft after his sophomore season, while Deshaun Thomas decided to return for his junior season.

Departures

Recruiting

Roster

Schedule

|-
!colspan=12| Exhibition

|-
!colspan=12| Regular season

|-
!colspan=12| Big Ten tournament

|-
!colspan=9| NCAA tournament

Source:

Rankings

References

Ohio State Buckeyes men's basketball seasons
Ohio State
Ohio State
Ohio State Buckeyes
Ohio State Buckeyes
Big Ten men's basketball tournament championship seasons